Ayesha Akhter (born 14 January 1984) is a Bangladeshi former cricketer who played as a right-handed batter and an occasional bowler. She appeared in three One Day Internationals and one Twenty20 International for Bangladesh in 2012 and 2013. She played domestic cricket for Dhaka Division and Chittagong Division.

References

External links
 

1984 births
Living people
People from Jamalpur District
Bangladeshi women cricketers
Bangladesh women One Day International cricketers
Bangladesh women Twenty20 International cricketers
Dhaka Division women cricketers
Chittagong Division women cricketers
Cricketers at the 2010 Asian Games
Asian Games medalists in cricket
Asian Games silver medalists for Bangladesh
Medalists at the 2010 Asian Games